Arum pictum is a plant of the arum family (Araceae), notable for being the only autumn-flowering plant of its genus.

The plant is native to the western Mediterranean in the Balearic Islands, Corsica, Sardinia, and Tuscany.

References

pictum
Flora of Spain
Flora of Italy
Flora of France
Plants described in 1782